Significant Others is an American sitcom that aired on Bravo for two seasons in 2004.  Following four couples from various backgrounds in and out of therapy, it focused on issues of adultery, parenthood, impending parenthood, and the chore of behaving like an adult.  Adopting the tone of many British comedies, it was almost entirely ad-libbed, without a laugh track, and put the viewer in the position of therapist, as the couples addressed the camera directly during the therapy sessions featured during each episode.

Produced by NBC, it was distributed by Bravo, the cable network on which it aired until its last episode on December 19, 2004.  While it primarily flew under the radar during its short run, it was heralded by many critics for its originality, dark humor, and fresh take on the pains of wedded "bliss."  Its entire two-season, twelve-episode run was released on DVD by Shout Factory on February 14, 2006.

The Couples
 Ethan (Herschel Bleefeld) and Eleanor (Faith Salie): hipsters coping with her pregnancy, and the fact that they have yet to grow up themselves
 James (Brian Palermo) and Chelsea (Andrea Savage): yuppies married after an all-too-short courtship, trying to balance their busy lives... and actually getting to know one another
 Alex (Chris Spencer) and Devon (Nicole Randall Johnson): a successful African-American couple trying to be the best parents they can be, whenever they're not arguing with each other (or anyone in earshot)
 Bill (Fred Goss) and Connie (Jane Edith Wilson): a loveless couple, barely sharing an existence after Bill loses his job and all motivation whatsoever, until he finds motivation comes in very unexpected shapes and sizes

Episodes

Series overview

Season 1 (2004)

Season 2 (2004)

Home media
The entire series was released on DVD in Region 1 on February 14, 2006.

References

External links

2000s American single-camera sitcoms
2004 American television series debuts
2004 American television series endings
Bravo (American TV network) original programming
Television series by Universal Television
English-language television shows
Television shows set in California
Improvisational television series